= Friesacher Burghofspiele =

Coordinates: 46.9514°N 14.4019°E

Friesacher Burghofspiele is a theatre in Austria.

Every year from June to August, the Friesach Burghofspiele bring the historic Petersberg stage to life, offering performances filled with humor and entertainment. This tradition, established in 1950 by professor and architect Hannes Sandler, continues to engage both actors and audiences.
